Leucania roseivena is a species of moth of the family Noctuidae. It is found in South America, including Colombia.

Leucania
Moths described in 1924